Sergei Mironovich Aseev (born 4 December 1957) is a Russian mathematician, Dr. Sc., Professor, and a Corresponding Member of the Russian Academy of Sciences.

He graduated from the faculty of MSU CMC in 1980.

He defended the thesis «Extremal problems for differential inclusions with phase constraints» for the degree of Doctor of Physical and Mathematical Sciences (1998).

Was awarded the title of Corresponding Member of the Russian Academy of Sciences (2008).

Author of 1 book and more than 30 scientific articles.

Area of scientific interests: The theory of multivalued mappings, optimal control, and mathematical models in economics.

Literature

References

External links
 Russian Academy of Sciences
 MSU CMC
 Scientific works of Sergei Aseev
 Scientific works of Sergei Aseev

Russian computer scientists
Russian mathematicians
Living people
1957 births
Academic staff of Moscow State University
Moscow State University alumni